Samuel Nelson Woods (July 2, 1920 – September 5, 1983) was an American Negro league pitcher in the 1940s.

A native of Springfield, Ohio, Woods attended Springfield High School. He made his Negro leagues debut in 1946 with the Cleveland Buckeyes, and played for the Memphis Red Sox in 1948. Woods went on to play minor league baseball in the 1950s with such clubs as the Pampa Oilers and Plainview Ponies. He died in Las Vegas, Nevada in 1983 at age 63.

References

External links
 and Seamheads

1920 births
1983 deaths
Cleveland Buckeyes players
Memphis Red Sox players
Plainview Ponies players
20th-century African-American sportspeople
Baseball pitchers